Mianyang (formerly known as Mienchow) is the second largest prefecture-level city of Sichuan province in Southwest China. Located in north-central Sichuan covering an area of  consisting of Jiangyou, a county-level city, five counties, and three urban districts. Its total population was 4,868,243 people at the 2020 Chinese census, of whom 2,232,865 live in its built-up (or metro) area made of three urban districts.

History 
Mianyang, which was known as Fuxian (Fu County) in ancient times, had advanced in agriculture during the Qin  (221−206 BCE) and Han (206 BCE−220 CE) dynasties. It has a history of over 2,200 years since the Emperor Gaozu of Han established the first county in this area in 201 BCE. Due to its advantageous location, it had always been a town of great military importance and formed a natural defence for Chengdu.

Mianyang is home to the CAEP and Science City, an immense Military Research Complex which was the site of the development of China's first nuclear bomb.

The city proper itself was only lightly damaged by the earthquake of 12 May 2008. However, Beichuan County, which is in the prefecture, was among the most severely hit of all disaster regions following the earthquake, including the Beichuan High School campus where more than 1,000 students lost their lives after two main buildings collapsed. Around 80% of the county's buildings are said to have collapsed, including its main government building. The casualty toll for the quake in Mianyang Prefecture as of 7 June 2008, was 21,963 people killed, 167,742 injured, and 8,744 people missing.

Geography and climate
Mianyang is at the northwestern end of the Sichuan Basin, on the upper to middle reaches of the Fu River. Its administrative area ranges in latitude from 30° 42' to 33° 03' N and in longitude from 103° 45' to 105° 43' E. Bordering prefectures are Guangyuan to the northeast, Nanchong to the east, Suining to the south, Deyang to the southwest, and the Ngawa Tibetan and Qiang Autonomous Prefecture to the west. It also borders Gansu for a small section in the north.

Mianyang has a monsoon-influenced humid subtropical climate (Köppen Cwa) and is largely mild and humid, with four distinct seasons. Winter is short, mild, and foggy, though precipitation is low. January averages , and while frost may occur, snow is rare. Summers are long, hot, and humid, with highs often exceeding . Rainfall is light in winter and can be heavy in summer, and more than 70% of the annual total occurs from May to September. The annual frost-free period across most of the prefecture lasts from 252 to 300 days, and there are only 1,100 hours of sunshine annually, which is not even 30% of the possible total.

Transport 
The city has highway and railway connections to several major cities and is on the road from Xi'an to the provincial capital of Chengdu as well as the Baocheng Railway running from Baoji in Shaanxi province to Chengdu.

Mianyang Nanjiao Airport, which is the second largest airport in Sichuan province, has direct flights to Beijing, Shanghai, Guangzhou, Xi'an, Shenzhen, Kunming, Hangzhou, and so on.

G5 Beijing–Kunming Expressway and G93 Chengyu Ring Expressway.

Economy 
Mianyang is one of China's major centres for the electronics industry. It has many well-known research institutions, such as the China Academy of Engineering Physics and China Aerodynamics Research and Development Center.  Many large-scale enterprises, such as Changhong Electronics Group Corporation, Sichuan DND Pharmaceutical Co., Ltd., Jiuzhou Electronics Group, Shuangma Cement Group, and Changcheng Special Steel Company also have their home in Mianyang.

Mianyang is an important national defence, scientific research, and production base, consisting of 18 institutes including the China Academy of Engineering Physics and the China Aerodynamics Research Institute. Moreover, it houses 50 large- and medium-size enterprises and six science colleges.

The provincial government will hand over greater administrative powers of economic management at the provincial-level authority to propel the development of Mianyang. The new economy management authority will pay close attention to the construction of the scientific city. The provincial committee party and government are presently drafting the "Opinions on Propelling China Scientific City Construction" report which is expected to come out soon.

Mianyang Hi-Tech Industrial Development Zone

Education
There are six universities and colleges in the city, and it is well-known as a science and technology centre.

The best known of these is Southwest University of Science and Technology, with a campus of 4000 mu (about ). There is a wide-band multimedia campus network, which is connected to the Internet. The student dorm has access to telephone, Internet, and TV. There are over 900,000 copies of books and over 10,000 electronic books in the library. The studying and living facilities are all on the campus.

Others:
 Tianfu College, Southwestern University of Finance and Economics
 Mianyang Normal University

People
It is the hometown of the famous poet Li Bai, and boasts many historical relics of the Three Kingdoms period.

Chinese food blogger and internet celebrity Li Ziqi is from Pingwu County on Mianyang and shoots most of her video content in the surrounding countryside.

Several ethnic minorities live in Mianyang, such as the Tibetan and Qiang people.

Food

·Mianyang Rice Noodles(绵阳米粉）： One of the famous traditional dishes of the Han nationality in the Mianyang area with a history of more than 1,800 years. There are three flavours: red soup, clear soup, and clear red soup.

·Lengzhanzhan（冷沾沾）： Lengzhanzhan originated in Mianyang Jiangyou. It is a snack that uses toothpicks to weave different dishes of meat and vegetables together and then dip different oil dishes.

Subdivisions

References

External links 

 Government of Mianyang
 Mianyang Municipal Investment Bureau : Europe
 Mianyang Investment commissioner in Europe

 
Cities in Sichuan
Prefecture-level divisions of Sichuan